Arhopala ammonides is a species of butterfly belonging to the lycaenid family described by William Doherty in 1891. It is found in Southeast Asia.

Subspecies
A. a. ammonides (Burma, Mergui)
A. a. elira Corbet, 1941 (Assam)
A. a. chunsu Fruhstorfer, 1914 (Sumatra, Peninsular Malaya)
A. a. monava Corbet, 1941 (Langkawi)
A. a. bowringi (Evans, 1957) (Hainan)
A. a. kalabakana Eliot, 1972 (Sabah)
A. a. apurpurosa Barlow, Banks & Holloway, 1971 (Borneo)

References

External links
"Arhopala Boisduval, 1832" at Markku Savela's Lepidoptera and Some Other Life Forms. Retrieved June 7, 2017.

Arhopala
Butterflies described in 1891
Taxa named by William Doherty
Butterflies of Asia